Pat Steward (born May 4, 1962) is a Canadian drummer and singer who is a member of the band Odds, and has recorded and toured with Bryan Adams and Matthew Good, among many others.

Early life
Steward was born in Vancouver, British Columbia to British parents who had recently relocated to the west coast of British Columbia. The family moved around the west coast in his youth; he began high school in Thousand Oaks, California and finished in Powell River, British Columbia. In high school, Steward was a keen student of the drums. At fifteen years old, he had a chance meeting with punk drumming pioneer Barry Taylor (K-Tels, the Young Canadians), and decided to hop on a Greyhound to Vancouver and hang out watching and sitting in as Barry and the Young Canadians played and rehearsed. In 1980, Steward enrolled in the jazz program at Malaspina College on Vancouver Island. There he met bass player Doug Elliott and they began a long friendship and musical partnership.

Career
In the early 1980s, Steward and Elliott performed together in the ska band Rubber Biscuit. In one of their shows, Steward was spotted by Bryan Adams and recruited to play on, and tour to promote, Adams' smash album Reckless. Among many world tour stops Steward performed with Adams at Live Aid in 1985 and on the “Conspiracy of Hope Tour” for Amnesty International in 1986.

During the late 1980s Steward was in demand as a touring and session drummer for the likes of Jimmy Barnes, John Eddie, Doug and the Slugs, Raymond May and others. A chance call in 1994 from old pal Doug Elliott had him step in to replace departing drummer Paul Brennan in Warner Recording artists Odds. Elliott had been a founding member of Odds and the band was mid-way through recording their commercial breakthrough album Good Weird Feeling when Steward joined the band. Steward would go on to record, compose and tour with Odds until their hiatus in 1999. After that point he continued to collaborate with Odds members Craig Northey and Doug Elliott in several other bands: Stripper's Union, Northey Valenzuela, and as the "Craig Northey Power Trio".

Along with other members of Odds, he has frequently collaborated with members of Canadian comedy troupe The Kids in the Hall. He played on the soundtracks of the Kids in the Hall film Brain Candy and mini-series Death Comes to Town. He also played on Kids in the Hall member Bruce McCulloch's 2002 album Drunk Baby Project, and the soundtrack for a film he directed, Dog Park (1998).

Steward also began an association with Canadian guitarist Colin James and recorded and toured with James on and off for the better part of a decade. His Odds bandmates eventually joined him in the Colin James Band.

In 2003 Steward performed on the album Avalanche with popular Canadian rocker Matthew Good. He toured with Good and continued on for Good's 2004 “White Light Rock & Roll Review” and 2007's Hospital Music.

By 2007 Odds had reformed. Steward resumed his role in the band while continuing as a session player. In 2008 Odds released their fifth album, Cheerleader. While touring and recording with Odds, Steward also fit in a tour with the reunited Payola$ (Bob Rock and Paul Hyde’s alt-rock band) and albums for Colin James, Barney Bentall, Dustin Bentall, Bryan Adams, Jann Arden, Stripper's Union, Swan, Leeroy Stagger, Wil, and Ridley Bent. Odds released the album the Most Beautiful Place On Earth in February 2013.

Steward is also busy as a clinician and, through his association with the Sonor drum company and Sabian cymbal company, he frequently teaches and talks about what he does.

Awards and honors
In 2012, Steward won the "Mike Norman All-Star Band - Drummer of the year" at the British Columbia Country Music Awards.

Discography

Albums
1984: Bryan Adams: Reckless 
1991: Chrissy Steele: Magnet to Steele
1991: Various Artists: Saturday Night Blues 
1992: Doug and the Slugs: Tales from Terminal City 
1991: Odds: Neopolitan 
1993: Odds: Bedbugs 
1995: Odds: Good Weird Feeling 
1996: Odds: Nest 
1999: Sharkskin: Sharkskin 
2000: David Gogo: Change of Pace 
2000: Odds: Singles Album 
2001: Camille Miller: She Knows 
2001: Wyckham Porteous: Sexanddrinking 
2002: Allen Dobb: Bottomland 
2002: Doug Cox: Stay Lazy 
2002: Bruce McCulloch: Drunk Baby Project 
2002: Various Artists: Women & Songs 6 
2003: Matthew Good: Avalanche 
2003: Northey Valenzuela: Northey Valenzuela 
2004: Matthew Good: White Light Rock & Roll Review 
2004: Various Artists: International Pop Overthrow 
2005: Bryan Adams: Chronicles: You Want It, You Got It/Cuts Like a Knife/Reckless 
2005: Bryan Adams: Anthology 
2005: Odds: Essentials 
2005: Colin James: Limelight 
2005: Stripper's Union: Stripper's Union Local 518 
2006: Barney Bentall: Gift Horse 
2007: Id Guinness: Cure for the Common Crush 
2007: Wil: By December 
2007: Faber Drive: Seven Second Surgery
2007: Matthew Good: Hospital Music 
2007: Ridley Bent: Buckles and Boots 
2008: Bryan Adams: 11 
2008: Cameron Latimer: Fallen Apart 
2009: Dustin Bentall: Six Shooter 
2009: Odds: Cheerleader 
2009: Leeroy Stagger: Everything is Real 
2009: Colin James: Rooftops and Satellites 
2010: Ridley Bent: Rabbit on My Wheel 
2010: Swan: Salt March 
2011: Stripper's Union: The Deuce 
2011: Small Sins: Pot Calls Kettle Black 
2011: David Gogo: Soul-Bender 
2011: Whitehorse: Whitehorse 
2013: Odds: the Most Beautiful Place on Earth 
2013: Matthew Good: Arrows of Desire''

Film and television

References

1962 births
Living people
Canadian drummers
Canadian male drummers
Canadian male singers
Canadian rock singers
Canadian alternative rock musicians
Musicians from Vancouver
Alternative rock drummers
Alternative rock singers